The Colossus-class battleships were British ironclad warships, carrying their main armament in turrets, which served in the Victorian Royal Navy from 1882. They were the first British warships to carry large rifled breech-loading main guns.

Design

They also used steel rather than iron for most of the hull structure, and utilised the innovative compound armour for the belt and turrets.

The class was originally designed to carry the then-standard muzzle-loading artillery, while European navies had already for several years been equipped with breech-loading guns. At this time, for historical reasons, the Board of Admiralty was ultimately responsible for the designs of Royal Naval warships, but the War Office was responsible for the design and provision of naval artillery. Responding to a groundswell of professional opinion, the Admiralty sent a group of senior officers to witness and report on the performance of the new breech-loading weapons being produced by Krupp in Essen. As a result of their report, Woolwich undertook the manufacture of 12 inch calibre breech-loaders, with a breech mechanism manufactured at Elswick. The Colossus class was nominated to be armed with these guns; the delay in their manufacture largely accounts for the protracted building times of these vessels.

Both ships did well on sea-trials, exceeding their design speed. They threw up what is described as a "remarkable bow wave, which rose like a solid wall for thirteen feet, the like of which has never been observed." They had a quick roll, and because of the low freeboard and the long chases of the guns, the gun muzzles dipped into the sea at a roll of 13° when trained on the beam. They were fitted with large bilge keels and with anti-rolling tanks.

They were both reported to be slow to respond to the helm, with large turning circles.

Ships

References

External links

 An Animated Technical Study of HMS Colossus

Battleship classes
 
Victorian-era battleships of the United Kingdom
Ship classes of the Royal Navy